Salamanca is a corregimiento in Colón District, Colón Province, Panama with a population of 3,881 as of 2010. Its population as of 1990 was 2,675; its population as of 2000 was 2,920.

References

Corregimientos of Colón Province